Mozaffar's Garden is a 2006 Iranian satire television series. It was directed by Mehran Modiri, who also narrates and stars as the title character. It ran from 1 September to 15 October 2006, with reruns continuing through 2007.

Plot
Siamak Ansari stars as Kamran, a strange young man who works at a transportation company run by Mr. Bordbaar, a fat man who is easily amused by everything. Mr. Bordbaar and his son are careless people, and Kamran is the only person who does any work at the company. Kamran is shy, hard-working, and a stranger to the Bordbaar family. Kamran is also in love with Nazi, Mr. Bordbaar's daughter, who still has feelings for her old fiancé. Kamran is too shy to show his feelings for Nazi. Kamran's father, "Mozaffar Khan Zargande," is a Khan who lives his life like old Tehran Khans.

Kamran has a sister, Forough Khanoom. She is snobby, spoiled, and does whatever she likes to do. She is a widow, and her past husbands have been killed by strange accidents that have something to do with how mean she is. The family has a servant named Heif-e-nan, which means "worthless". He craves abuse from his masters. They also have a sloppy, worthless lawyer named Jamshid, who is trying to get the family to sell the garden. According to Jamshid, Tehran is going to have a highway that runs through the garden and they should sell it before the price drops drastically. The Zargande family live in a huge garden which is shared by Mozaffar Khan's Cousin, Mansour Khan. Mansour Khan, suffers from short term memory-loss, hates his cousin, and is old with no family of his own. As the story progresses, Kamran pursues his love while juggling his odd family responsibilities.

Cast

Garden residents

 Mehran Modiri as Mozaffar Khan and the narrator
 Siamak Ansari as Kamran
 Mohammad-Reza Hedayati as Mansoor Khan
 Sahar Jafari Jozani as Forough Khanoom
 Nasrollah Radesh as Heif-e-nan
 Ali Lakpourian as Jamshid
 Reza Shafiei Jam as Gholmorad

The Bordbaars

 Nader Soleimani as Mr. Mehrdad Bordbaar
 Elika Abdolrazaghi as Mrs. Mahnaz Bordbaar
 Shaghayegh Dehghan as Nazi Bordbaar

Recurring

 Behnoosh Bakhtiari as Sheida and Ashraf
 Hadi Kazemi as Nima
 Saeid Pirdoost as Kambiz
 Saed Hedayati as Parviz

See also
 Noghtechin
 Pavarchin
 Comedy films in cinema of Iran
 Mehran Modiri filmography

References

External links
 

Iranian television series
2000s Iranian television series
2006 Iranian television series debuts
2007 Iranian television series endings
Islamic Republic of Iran Broadcasting original programming
Persian-language television shows